Sviland Chapel is a parish church of the Church of Norway in the large Sandnes municipality in Rogaland county, Norway. It is located in the village of Sviland in the rural borough of Sviland on the eastern edge of the city of Sandnes which is in the western part of the municipality. It is one of the two churches for the Høyland parish which is part of the Sandnes prosti (deanery) in the Diocese of Stavanger. The white, wooden church was built in a long church design in 1913 using designs by the architect Michale Slettebø. The church seats about 140 people.

History
In 1905, some of the initial site work began at the site of the new chapel. Construction began in 1911 and it was completed in 1913. The new building was consecrated on 23 October 1913. The ceremony was notable in that the Bishop Kristian Vilhelm Koren Schjelderup Sr. who was leading the consecration became ill during the service and he died shortly thereafter.

Media gallery

See also
List of churches in Rogaland

References

Sandnes
Churches in Rogaland
Wooden churches in Norway
20th-century Church of Norway church buildings
Churches completed in 1913
1913 establishments in Norway